Dušan Lukić (born 13 December 1948) is a Serbian former footballer who played as a midfielder.

Career
After starting out at Mladenovac, Lukić spent nine seasons with OFK Beograd between 1969 and 1978, making 206 appearances and scoring 29 goals in the Yugoslav First League.

In 1978, Lukić went to the United States and spent three seasons in the North American Soccer League. He also played indoor soccer in the Major Indoor Soccer League.

References

External links
 

1948 births
Living people
Footballers from Belgrade
Yugoslav footballers
Serbian footballers
Association football midfielders
OFK Mladenovac players
OFK Beograd players
San Jose Earthquakes (1974–1988) players
Tulsa Roughnecks (1978–1984) players
Philadelphia Fury (1978–1980) players
St. Louis Steamers players
Rochester Lancers (1967–1980) players
Philadelphia Fever (MISL) players
FK Sinđelić Beograd players
Yugoslav First League players
North American Soccer League (1968–1984) players
Major Indoor Soccer League (1978–1992) players
Yugoslav expatriate footballers
Expatriate soccer players in the United States
Yugoslav expatriate sportspeople in the United States